Tadesse Abraham (born 12 August 1982) is an Eritrea-born Swiss long-distance runner who specialises in the marathon.

Career
Tadesse Abraham competed in the marathon event at the 2015 World Championships in Athletics in Beijing, China. In 2016, he finished 7th in the Marathon at the Rio Summer Olympics. In the same year, he won gold in the half marathon at the European Championships in Amsterdam and improved the Swiss national record of Viktor Röthlin, set in 2007, to 2:06:40 at the Seoul Marathon. Due to an injury, Abraham missed most of the 2017 season, including the World Championships in London. He made his marathon comeback at the New York City Marathon in November, where he finished 5th.

References

External links

 
 

1982 births
Living people
Sportspeople from Asmara
Swiss male long-distance runners
Swiss male marathon runners
Olympic athletes of Switzerland
Eritrean male long-distance runners
World Athletics Championships athletes for Switzerland
European Athletics Championships medalists
Eritrean emigrants to Switzerland
Athletes (track and field) at the 2016 Summer Olympics
Athletes (track and field) at the 2020 Summer Olympics